William Harper Twelvetrees (1848 – 7 November 1919) was an English geologist who was important for the characterisation of the geology of Tasmania.

Twelvetrees was born in Bedfordshire, England, in 1848, to industrialist Harper Twelvetrees and Mary Hubbard. He was educated in London and in Germany. From 1871 to 1880 he was employed at copper mines in eastern Russia, and from 1882 to 1890 at the Lidjessi silver-lead mines in Asia Minor, of which he was general manager from 1884.

He went to Tasmania in 1890 and followed various occupations until August 1899, when he was appointed Tasmanian government geologist and chief inspector of mines.

He was a joint author of a number of articles and books about western Tasmanian geology, including with William Frederick Petterd.

In 1914 the office of chief inspector of mines was made a separate one, but Twelvetrees continued to act as government geologist and director of the geological survey of Tasmania until his death.  He worked with energy and enthusiasm and his department grew in size and importance.  He also interested himself in the Launceston Museum, which was extended so that the excellent geological survey collection of specimens could be housed.  He died at Launceston after a short illness on 7 November 1919. 

He was married twice: to Mary Adelaide Austin, who died on 11 July 1899, and then to Sarah Elvin Genders, who survived him.  He was awarded the Clarke Medal of the Royal Society of New South Wales in 1912.

His writing in the bulletins of the Tasmanian geological survey and other publications, occurred at a very busy time in the West Coast, Tasmania region's mining history, which has not been repeated since.

Example of reports
Twelvetrees, W.H. (1903), The Progress of the Mineral Industry of Tasmania for the Quarter Ending 31 December 1902.
Twelvetrees, W.H. (1905), The Progress of the Mineral Industry of Tasmania for the Quarter Ending 31 December 1904.

Notes

References

Further reading

1848 births
1919 deaths
19th-century Australian geologists
People from Bedfordshire
20th-century Australian geologists